Polybetes is a genus of South American huntsman spiders that was first described by Eugène Louis Simon in 1897. It is a senior synonym of Leptosparassus and Streptaedoea.

They are commonly found in tall grass and on the bark or branches of trees. At least two species have adapted to urban environments and have been found indoors. They are large and somewhat aggressive spiders, but their venom is not toxic enough to be dangerous to humans.

Species
 it contains fifteen species, all endemic to South America:
Polybetes bombilius (F. O. Pickard-Cambridge, 1899) – Peru
Polybetes delfini Simon, 1904 – Chile
Polybetes fasciatus (Keyserling, 1880) – Brazil, Peru
Polybetes germaini Simon, 1897 – Brazil, Paraguay, Argentina
Polybetes hyeroglyphicus (Mello-Leitão, 1918) – Brazil
Polybetes martius (Nicolet, 1849) (type) – Chile, Argentina
Polybetes obnuptus Simon, 1897 – Bolivia, Argentina
Polybetes pallidus Mello-Leitão, 1941 – Argentina
Polybetes parvus (Järvi, 1914) – Paraguay
Polybetes punctulatus Mello-Leitão, 1944 – Argentina
Polybetes pythagoricus (Holmberg, 1875) – Brazil, Guyana, Uruguay, Paraguay, Argentina
Polybetes quadrifoveatus (Järvi, 1914) – Argentina
Polybetes rapidus (Keyserling, 1880) – Suriname to Argentina
Polybetes rubrosignatus Mello-Leitão, 1943 – Brazil
Polybetes trifoveatus (Järvi, 1914) – Paraguay, Argentina

See also
 List of Sparassidae species

References

Araneomorphae genera
Sparassidae
Spiders of South America